Petr Kladiva (born 4 July 1967) is a Czech swimmer. He competed in three events at the 1988 Summer Olympics.

References

1967 births
Living people
Czech male swimmers
Olympic swimmers of Czechoslovakia
Swimmers at the 1988 Summer Olympics
Place of birth missing (living people)